Avô is a civil parish in the municipality of Oliveira do Hospital, Portugal. The population in 2011 was 595, in an area of 7.17 km².

References

Freguesias of Oliveira do Hospital